In population genetics, linkage disequilibrium (LD) is the non-random association of alleles at different loci in a given population. Loci are said to be in linkage disequilibrium when the frequency of association of their different alleles is higher or lower than what would be expected if the loci were independent and associated randomly.

Linkage disequilibrium is influenced by many factors, including selection, the rate of genetic recombination, mutation rate, genetic drift, the system of mating, population structure, and genetic linkage. As a result, the pattern of linkage disequilibrium in a genome is a powerful signal of the population genetic processes that are structuring it.

In spite of its name, linkage disequilibrium may exist between alleles at different loci without any genetic linkage between them and independently of whether or not allele frequencies are in equilibrium (not changing with time). Furthermore, linkage disequilibrium is sometimes referred to as gametic phase disequilibrium; however, the concept also applies to asexual organisms and therefore does not depend on the presence of gametes.

Formal definition

Suppose that among the gametes that are formed in a sexually reproducing population, allele A occurs with frequency  at one locus (i.e.  is the proportion of gametes with A at that locus), while at a different locus allele B occurs with frequency . Similarly, let  be the frequency with which both A and B occur together in the same gamete (i.e.  is the frequency of the AB haplotype).

The association between the alleles A and B can be regarded as completely random—which is known in statistics as independence—when the occurrence of one does not affect the occurrence of the other, in which case the probability that both A and B occur together is given by the product  of the probabilities.

The level of linkage disequilibrium between A and B can be quantified by the coefficient of linkage disequilibrium , which is defined as

 

In the case  we have  and the alleles A and B are said to be in linkage equilibrium. The subscript "AB" on  emphasizes that linkage disequilibrium is a property of the pair {A, B} of alleles and not of their respective loci. Other pairs of alleles at those same two loci may have different coefficients of linkage disequilibrium.

For two biallelic loci, where a and b are the other alleles at these two loci, the restrictions are so strong that only one value of D is sufficient to represent all linkage disequilibrium relationships between these alleles. In this case, . Their relationships can be characterized as follows.

The sign of D in this case is chosen arbitrarily. The magnitude of D is more important than the sign of D because the magnitude of D is representative of the degree of linkage disequilibrium. However, positive D value means that the gamete is more frequent than expected while negative means that the combination of these two alleles are less frequent than expected.

Linkage disequilibrium in asexual populations can be defined in a similar way in terms of population allele frequencies. Furthermore, it is also possible to define linkage disequilibrium among three or more alleles, however these higher-order associations are not commonly used in practice.

Measures derived from D

The coefficient of linkage disequilibrium  is not always a convenient measure of linkage disequilibrium because its range of possible values depends on the frequencies of the alleles it refers to. This makes it difficult to compare the level of linkage disequilibrium between different pairs of alleles.

Lewontin suggested normalising D by dividing it by the theoretical maximum difference between the observed and expected haplotype frequencies as follows:

 

where

 

Limits for the ranges of linkage disequilibrium measures

The measures  and  have limits to their ranges and do not range over all values of zero to one for all pairs of loci. The maximum of  depends on the allele frequencies at the two loci being compared and can only range fully from zero to one where either the allele frequencies at both loci are equal,  where , or when the allele frequencies have the relationship  when .

Example: Two-loci and two-alleles 

Consider the haplotypes for two loci A and B with two alleles each—a two-loci, two-allele model. Then the following table defines the frequencies of each combination:

Note that these are relative frequencies. One can use the above frequencies to determine the frequency of each of the alleles:

The deviation of the observed frequency of a haplotype from the expected is a quantity  called the linkage disequilibrium and is commonly denoted by a capital D:

 

The following table illustrates the relationship between the haplotype frequencies and allele frequencies and D.

Role of recombination

In the absence of evolutionary forces other than random mating,  Mendelian segregation, random chromosomal assortment, and chromosomal crossover (i.e. in the absence of natural selection, inbreeding, and genetic drift),
the linkage disequilibrium measure  converges to zero along the time axis at a rate
depending on the magnitude of the recombination rate  between the two loci.

Using the notation above, we can demonstrate this convergence to zero
as follows.  In the next generation, the frequency of the haplotype , becomes

 

This follows because a fraction  of the haplotypes in the offspring have not
recombined, and are thus copies of a random haplotype in their parents. A fraction 
have recombined these two loci.  If the parents result from random mating, the probability of the

This formula can be rewritten as

 

so that

 

Thus we have

 

If , then  so that  converges to zero.

If at some time we observe linkage disequilibrium, it will disappear in the future due to recombination.

Example: Human leukocyte antigen (HLA) alleles

HLA constitutes a group of cell surface antigens also known as the MHC of humans. Because HLA genes are located at adjacent loci on the particular region of a chromosome and presumed to exhibit epistasis with each other or with other genes, a sizable fraction of alleles are in linkage disequilibrium.

An example of such linkage disequilibrium is between HLA-A1 and B8 alleles in unrelated Danes referred to by Vogel and Motulsky (1997).

Because HLA is codominant and HLA expression is only tested locus by locus in surveys, LD measure is to be estimated from such a 2×2 table to the right.

expression frequency of antigen  :

expression frequency of antigen  :

frequency of gene , given that individuals with '+/−', '+/+', and '−/+' genotypes are all positive for antigen :

and

Denoting the '―' alleles at antigen i to be x, and at antigen j to be y, the observed frequency of haplotype xy is

 

and the estimated frequency of haplotype xy is

Then LD measure  is expressed as

Standard errors  are obtained as follows:

Then, if

For data in Table 1 it is 20.9, thus existence of statistically significant LD between A1 and B8 in the population is admitted.

Table 2 shows some of the combinations of HLA-A and B alleles where significant LD was observed among pan-Europeans.

Vogel and Motulsky (1997) argued how long would it take that linkage disequilibrium between loci of HLA-A and B disappeared. Recombination between loci of HLA-A and B was considered to be of the order of magnitude 0.008. We will argue similarly to Vogel and Motulsky below. In case LD measure was observed to be 0.003 in pan-Europeans in the list of Mittal it is mostly non-significant. Suppose a generation took 25 years, this means 10,000 years. The time span seems rather short in the history of humans. Thus observed linkage disequilibrium between HLA-A and B loci might indicate some sort of interactive selection.

The presence of linkage disequilibrium between an HLA locus and a presumed major gene of disease susceptibility corresponds to any of the following phenomena:
 Relative risk for the person having a specific HLA allele to become suffered from a particular disease is greater than 1.
 The HLA antigen frequency among patients exceeds more than that among a healthy population. This is evaluated by  value to exceed 0.

2×2 association table of patients and healthy controls with HLA alleles shows a significant deviation from the equilibrium state deduced from the marginal frequencies.

(1) Relative risk

Relative risk of an HLA allele for a disease is approximated by the odds ratio in the 2×2 association table of the allele with the disease. Table 3 shows association of HLA-B27 with ankylosing spondylitis among a Dutch population. Relative risk of this allele is approximated by

 

Woolf's method is applied to see if there is statistical significance. Let

and

Then

In the data of Table 3, a significant association exists at the 0.1% level.

and

respectively.

In Table 4, some examples of association between HLA alleles and diseases are presented.

(1a) Allele frequency excess among patients over controls

Even high relative risks between HLA alleles and the diseases were observed, only the magnitude of relative risk would not be able to determine the strength of association. value is expressed by

In Table 4,  column was added in this quotation. Putting aside 2 diseases with high relative risks both of which are also with high  values, among other diseases, juvenile diabetes mellitus (type 1) has a strong association with DR4 even with a low relative risk.

(2) Discrepancies from expected values from marginal frequencies in 2×2 association table of HLA alleles and disease

This can be confirmed by  test calculating

where . For data with small sample size, such as no marginal total is greater than 15 (and consequently ), one should utilize Yates's correction for continuity or Fisher's exact test.

Resources

A comparison of different measures of LD is provided by Devlin & Risch

The International HapMap Project enables the study of LD in human populations online. The Ensembl project integrates HapMap data with other genetic information from dbSNP.

Analysis software
 PLINK – whole genome association analysis toolset, which can calculate LD among other things
 LDHat
 Haploview
 LdCompare— open-source software for calculating LD.
 SNP and Variation Suite – commercial software with interactive LD plot.
 GOLD – Graphical Overview of Linkage Disequilibrium
 TASSEL – software to evaluate linkage disequilibrium, traits associations, and evolutionary patterns
 rAggr – finds proxy markers (SNPs and indels) that are in linkage disequilibrium with a set of queried markers, using the 1000 Genomes Project and HapMap genotype databases.
 SNeP – Fast computation of LD and Ne for large genotype datasets in PLINK format.
 LDlink – A suite of web-based applications to easily and efficiently explore linkage disequilibrium in population subgroups. All population genotype data originates from Phase 3 of the 1000 Genomes Project and variant RS numbers are indexed based on dbSNP build 151.
Bcftools  – utilities for variant calling and manipulating VCFs and BCFs.

Simulation software
 Haploid — a C library for population genetic simulation (GPL)

See also
Haploview
Hardy–Weinberg principle
Genetic linkage
Co-adaptation
Genealogical DNA test
Tag SNP
Association mapping
Family based QTL mapping

References

Further reading

 Bibliography: Linkage Disequilibrium Analysis : a bibliography of more than one thousand articles on Linkage disequilibrium published since 1918.

Population genetics